Thomas L. O'Connor (born November 8, 1963) is a former professional American Football punter who played three games in the NFL for the New York Jets

References

1963 births
Living people
People from Patchogue, New York
American football punters
South Carolina Gamecocks football players
Miami Dolphins players
New York Jets players
National Football League replacement players